Gymnophalloides is a genus of flatworms belonging to the family Gymnophallidae.

The species of this genus are found in America.

Species:

Gymnophalloides heardi 
Gymnophalloides nacellae 
Gymnophalloides seoi 
Gymnophalloides tokiensis

References

Platyhelminthes